Bongaigaon Law College commonly known as BLC is a private aided law school situated at Borpara, Mayapuri in Bongaigaon in the Indian state of Assam. It offers undergraduate 3 years B.A. LL.B. courses affiliated to Gauhati University. This College is recognised by Bar Council of India (BCI), New Delhi.

The college offers a three-year LL.B. course (Bachelor of Laws), a five-year B.A.LL.B. course (Bachelor of Arts + Bachelor of Laws), and a one-year LL.M. course (Master of Laws).

History
Bongaigaon Law College was established on 25 January 1993 in the campus of the Birjhora H.S. School, Bongaigaon. Gauhati University initially granted temporary affiliation to this law college. In 2010, the college obtained Permanent Affiliation from the Gauhati University.

References

Law schools in Assam
Educational institutions established in 1993
1993 establishments in Assam
Colleges affiliated to Gauhati University
Education in Bongaigaon
Colleges in Bongaigaon